MTN Group Limited (formerly M-Cell) is a South African multinational mobile telecommunications company, operating in many African and Asian countries. Its head office is in Johannesburg. , MTN recorded 280 million subscribers, making it the 8th largest mobile network operator in the world, and the largest in Africa. Active in over 20 countries, one-third of the company's revenue comes from Nigeria, where it holds about 35% market share.

MTN Group is the primary sponsor of the South Africa national rugby union team and sponsors English football club Manchester United and Zambian Super League. The Nigerian subsidiary of the group also has an existing sponsorship deal with the Nigerian Football Federation.

History 
The company was founded in 1994 as M-Cell with assistance from the South African government. In 1995, it replaced its then-CEO, John Beck, with Robert (Bob) Chaphe and founder Leena Jaitley. In 2001, the company reported that its controlling shareholder was Johnnic Holdings, and the chairperson was Irene Charnley. In 2002, Phuthuma Nhleko became the CEO, replacing then-CEO Paul Edwards, who had invested in expansion to Nigeria.

MTN's competitors in South Africa include Vodacom, Cell C and Telkom Mobile.

In May 2008, Bharti Airtel, an India-based telecommunications company, explored the possibility of buying MTN Group. Reliance Communications was also in talks with MTN for a "potential combination of their businesses". In July, the two companies ended discussions regarding the merger.

In June 2008, MTN Group agreed to purchase Verizon Business South Africa, which was a provider of data services to customers in South Africa and four other African countries. The acquisition was completed on 28 February 2009.

On 26 June 2009, MTN Group's subsidiary merged with Belgacom International Carrier Services (BICS), a subsidiary of Belgacom. The combined subsidiary functioned as the international gateway for carrier services of MTN.

In October 2012, MTN announced a partnership with Afrihost to provide DSL Broadband services in Africa.

In November 2012, South African holding company Shanduka Group acquired a minority stake in MTN Group's Nigeria business for $335 million. 
In 2014, MTN was named on the 2014 BrandZ Top 100 Most Valuable Global Brand rankings and named the Most Admired and Most Valuable Brand in Africa. MTN retained its ranking as the Most Admired and the Most Valuable African brand in 2015.

In March 2016, the company appointed Rob Shuter as chief executive officer. Shutter was replaced on 1 September 2020 when Ralph Mupita was appointed Chief Executive.

MTN Ghana IPO

On 31 May 2018, MTN Ghana launched its initial public offering (IPO). The IPO closed on 31 July 2019. A total of up to 4,637,394,533 ordinary shares of MTN Ghana, representing 35% of its equity was offered to qualifying applicants. This was part of the agreement between MTN Ghana and Ghana's National Communications Authority (NCA) in November, 2015 for MTN Ghana to deploy 4G LTE mobile services to its customers in Ghana. Among other methods of payments, MTN mobile money was included as a payment option for the MTN share offer subscription. This was the first time mobile money had been used as a payment method in an IPO. The current CEO of MTN Ghana is Mr. Selorm Adadevoh.

MTN Shuts Down Stores
On February 23, 2017, Nigerian protestors attacked a MTN office in Abuja, Nigeria as a counterattack due to violence targeted against Nigerians in South Africa.

In September 2019 MTN began closing stores in Nigeria and some of their stores in Johannesburg, South Africa due to rioting, looting, and attacks on some of their facilities.

Geoffrey Onyeama the Nigerian Foreign Minister stated at a press briefing on September 4, 2019, that MTN group along with Shoprite, stated that the targeted South African stores in Nigeria are "subsidiaries that are owned by Nigerians." And that "the property owned by Nigerians within Nigeria and the people working there are Nigerians."

Lai Mohammed, Nigeria's Minister of Information and Culture, reported that some of the South African companies that were attacked in Nigeria have Nigerian investors owning significant amounts of stakes, and Nigerian employees.

MTN has stated that they will continue to do business in Nigeria.

Services
In March 2019 MTN launched a WhatsApp channel to let its customers buy airtime and data bundles through the messaging app. Customers can also check their balances and store their credit or debit cards in the app for future purchases. The service is provided by another South African company that has a global reach, Clickatell, which is a WhatsApp Business Solution provider.

Cyprus branch re-branding
MTN sold its Cyprus branch to Monaco Telecom for €260 million in July 2018. It was later re-branded as Epic in June 2019.

In December 2019, former Deputy Finance Minister of the Government of South Africa, Mcebisi Jonas, was appointed as the board chairperson of the company.

Middle East exodus
In August 2020, MTN decided to sell its shares in Syria, Afghanistan and Yemen, and to divest its 49% minority holding in Irancell over time. The company's decision was based on the fact that their assets in the Middle East contributed less than 4% to group earnings in the first half of the year.  MTN Group has transferred its majority 82.8% shareholding in MTN Yemen to Emerald International Investment, thereby exiting the market.

Sale of stake in Jumia 
On October 30, 2020, MTN made public the sale of their shares in the e-commerce brand Jumia. The sale was worth 142.31 million dollars.

MTN Mastercard Collaboration 
In February 2021, the MTN Group partnered with Mastercard to ensure safe and secure global e-commerce payments of their customer base in 16 African countries. A Mastercard virtual payment platform, that is linked to MTN MoMo (Mobile Money) wallets makes this possible.

Mobile Money spin-off 
In March 2021, MTN CEO Ralph Mupita announced during the company's annual results call that the group was now considering spinning off its mobile money activities. "We see a separation and carve out of our fintech business as something that we have to do”. In April 2021, he estimated the value of the group's mobile money arm to at least US$5 to 6 billion.

Technology 

MTN South Africa provides GSM, UMTS, HSPA+ (21.1 Mbit/s), HSUPA (42 Mbit/s, 2100 MHz), VOIP, 3G, 4G, LTE and 5G services. On 1 December 2011, MTN became the second cellular provider to introduce 4G and LTE in South Africa They were also the first network operator in South Africa to launch a live public 5G network available in Johannesburg and Cape Town On 30 June 2020

Coverage 
MTN acquired Investcom, mainly under the Areeba and Spacetel brands.

As of Q4 2018, MTN is active in:

SuperSonic 
SuperSonic is owned by MTN Group.

Supersonic provides Fibre through most Service Providers including OpenServe and Vumatel. SuperSonic also offers “Air Fibre”, a 5G Based Mobile data service introduced in February 2021.

In July 2021, they were fourth from the bottom of a list of 16 big ISP's that were rated.

Sponsorships
MTN Group sponsored the CAF Champions League football competition, as well as APOEL FC, winners of the Cypriot First Division in 2009, 2011, 2013 and 2014, and participants in the 2009–10 and 2011–12 UEFA Champions League.

On 18 March 2010, it was announced that MTN signed a sponsorship deal with English football club Manchester United F.C.

Since 2017, MTN Group is the primary sponsor of the South Africa national rugby union team.

Controversies

Iran
MTN has been criticised for its activities in Iran's telecommunications sector. MTN has a 49 percent stake in government-controlled MTN Irancell, the second-largest mobile phone operator in Iran, and 21 percent of MTN's subscriber base is from the country. In January 2012, the US-based advocacy group United Against Nuclear Iran (UANI) launched a campaign publicly calling for MTN to scale back its operations in Iran and end its business in the country. UANI alleges that MTN technology is "enabling the Iranian government to locate and track individual cellphone users which it says is a violation of users' human rights".

In June 2012, Reuters and the BBC reported an allegation by Chris Kilowan, a former executive for the company in Iran, that MTN Group may have been complicit in securing American telecommunications technology from Sun Microsystems, Hewlett-Packard and Cisco Systems on behalf of Irancell, in violation of trade sanctions against Iran. Oracle, which owns Sun Microsystems, said that it was investigating and denied involvement, saying that it complies with US export laws. Hewlett-Packard issued a similar statement. MTN Group denied the allegations, saying that it complied with US sanctions against Iran.

Turkcell court case
Turkey's Turkcell filed a $4.2 billion lawsuit in Washington, D.C., in 2012 alleging the company used bribery to win a mobile licence in Iran that was first awarded to Turkcell. The court delayed the case in October 2012 pending a US Supreme Court decision on the Alien Tort Statute, the US human rights law on which Turkcell's suit is based. In May 2013, Turkcell dropped its multibillion-dollar US lawsuit against MTN Group, citing a US Supreme Court ruling that hurt its case. On 27 November 2013, Turkcell resumed in Johannesburg.

Nigeria $5.2 billion fine

In 2015, the Nigerian subsidiary of MTN was fined by the Government of the Federal Republic of Nigeria  through the telecommunications regulator, Nigerian Communications Commission (NCC) for partial compliance of regulatory guidelines to Mobile Network Operators to disconnect from their network, all improperly registered Subscribers Identification Modules (SIM). The commission exercised section 20(1) of the Telephone Subscribers regulation (TSR) law on MTN, leading to a calculated fine of $5.2 billion, according to the constitution.

The compliance audit carried out by the NCC on MTN network revealed unregistered 5.2 million customers lines were not deactivated as directed. This led to the NCC fining MTN with the sum of $1000 for each unregistered SIM according to the Telephone Subscribers regulation (TSR) law, which amounted to $5.2bn.

What followed was major resignations among the top echelon of the organization including the chief executive officer, Sifiso Dabengwa, the Head of Nigeria Operation, Micheal Ikpoki and the Head of Cooperate Affairs, Akinwale Goodluck being replaced with Phuthuma Nhleko, Ferdi Moolman and Amina Oyegbola as new chairman, managing director and Head of Corporate and Regulation respectively.

The new management employed a diplomatic measure between the government of the Republic of South Africa and its Nigerian counterpart to ameliorate the burden of the liabilities from the fine. This action brought about the reduction of the liability to $3.2 billion.

South Africa
In September 2021, MTN announced that it will close its zero-rated access to the popular social network Twitter. As of early 2022, MTN has had poor internet connection throughout the country, the cause is still unknown.

See also

 Mobile telephony in Africa
 MTN $5.2 billion fine

References

External links

 

 
Telecommunications companies of South Africa
Internet service providers of South Africa
Mobile phone companies of South Africa
Multinational companies headquartered in South Africa
Telecommunications companies established in 1994
South African companies established in 1994
Telecommunications companies of Afghanistan
Telecommunications companies of Uganda
Mobile phone companies of Afghanistan
Mobile phone companies of Uganda
Mobile phone companies of Yemen
Companies based in Johannesburg
South African brands
Companies listed on the Johannesburg Stock Exchange
Telecommunications in Nigeria